Calvin and the Colonel is an American animated sitcom about Colonel Montgomery J. Klaxon, a shrewd fox, and Calvin T. Burnside, a dumb bear. Their lawyer was Oliver Wendell Clutch, who was a (literal) weasel. The colonel lived with his wife Maggie Belle and her sister Susan Culpepper, who did not trust the colonel at all. Colonel Klaxon was in the real estate business, but always tried get-rich-quick schemes with Calvin's unwitting help.

Series overview
The series was an animated remake of Amos 'n' Andy [or, more or less, "Andy and The Kingfish"] and featured the voices of Freeman Gosden and Charles Correll from the radio series (in fact, several of the original radio scripts by Joe Connelly & Bob Mosher were adapted for this series). Using animals avoided the touchy racial issues which had led to the downfall of Amos 'n' Andy.

Because of low ratings, the show was cancelled after two months, but returned two months later on Saturday evenings to complete the first season contract (and to fulfill Lever Brothers' agreement to sponsor the program; they originally sponsored The Amos 'n' Andy Show on radio during the 1940s). For a year afterward reruns were seen on Saturday mornings, and eventually syndicated through the 1960s. It was also adapted as a comic book by Dell Comics, and as such the first of two issues was the final installment in the company's extremely prolific (more than 1,300 issues published) Four Color anthology series. Despite its low ratings in America, the series gained popularity in Australia during its initial run, with reruns airing on Channel 7 up to the late 1980s.

A brief sequence from the show was seen on a television set in a 1966 episode of The Munsters ("A Visit From Johann"), which was also produced by Connelly and Mosher.

Much like other animated sitcom programs of the time (The Flintstones, Top Cat and The Jetsons), the series had a laugh track in the episodes (this was the same laugh track used in The Munsters, because the laugh track was supported by Kayro Productions which produced both of these shows).

Credits
Created by Freeman Gosden, Charles Correll
Voices: Freeman Gosden, Charles Correll, Beatrice Kay, Virginia Gregg, Paul Frees
Music: George Bruns
Animation Producers [Creston Studios]: Bob Ganon, Sam Nicholson, Gerald Ray
Art Director: Norm Gottfredson
Animation Directors: Chuck McKimson, John Walker
Supervising Animators: Tom McDonald, John Sparey, Bob Bemiller
Production Coordinator: Dave Hoffman
Editing: Norm Vizents
Sound: Phil Kaye
Recording Director: Cliff Howell
Production Executive: Al Amatuzio
Produced by Joe Connelly and Bob Mosher

Episodes

References

External links

 TOON TRACKER "Calvin and the Colonel" via the Wayback Machine
 Calvin and the Colonel at Don Markstein's Toonopedia. Archived from the original on April 14, 2012.
 BCDb: Calvin And The Colonel
 

1960s American animated television series
1960s American sitcoms
1961 American television series debuts
1962 American television series endings
American animated sitcoms
American children's animated comedy television series
American Broadcasting Company original programming
Television duos
Animated television series about foxes
Animated television series about bears
Television series by Universal Television
Television remakes
Amos 'n' Andy